The Snettisham Hoard or Snettisham Treasure is a series of discoveries of Iron Age precious metal, found in the Snettisham area of the English county of Norfolk between 1948 and 1973.

Iron age hoard
The hoard consists of metal, jet and over 150 gold/silver/copper alloy torc fragments, over 70 of which form complete torcs, dating from BC 70. Probably the most famous item from the hoard is the Great Torc from Snettisham, which is now held by the British Museum. Though the origins are unknown, it is of a high enough quality to have been royal treasure of the Iceni.

Recent electron microscopy research by the British Museum reveal the wear patterns in the torcs, the chemical composition of the metal, and the cut marks which reduced many of the torcs into fragments. One hypothesis suggests the deliberate destruction of valuable items was a form of votive offering.

The finds are deposited in Norwich Castle Museum and the British Museum. The hoard was ranked as number 4 in the list of British archaeological finds selected by experts at the British Museum for the 2003 BBC Television documentary, Our Top Ten Treasures, presented by Adam Hart-Davis.

Similar specimens are the Sedgeford Torc, found in 1965, and the Newark Torc, found in 2005, as well as the six torcs from the Ipswich Hoard found in 1968-9.

Romano-British hoard
In 1985 there was also a find of Romano-British jewellery and raw materials buried in a clay pot in AD 155, the Snettisham Jeweller's Hoard. Though it has no direct connection with the nearby Iron Age finds, it may be evidence of a long tradition of gold- and silver-working in the area.

See also 
List of hoards in Britain
Iceni
Celtic Britain

References

External links
 Norfolk Museums Service

Objects of historical interest in Norfolk
Archaeology of Norfolk
Archaeological sites in Norfolk
Prehistoric sites in England
Treasure troves of the Iron Age
Treasure troves of Roman Britain
Treasure troves in England
Torcs
Prehistoric objects in the British Museum
Romano-British objects in the British Museum
Ancient Celtic metalwork
1948 archaeological discoveries
1973 archaeological discoveries
1948 in England
1973 in England
Hoards from Iron Age Britain